Anatoly Dmitriyevich Myshkin (born August 14, 1954) is a retired Soviet and Russian professional basketball player and coach. At 6 feet 9  inches (2.07 m) tall, and a weight of 210 lbs. (95 kg), he played as a combo forward (small forward-power forward). Myshkin was able to break up all of the defensive schemes in European basketball, due to his unique skill set. He was mobile and aggressive, and he possessed the speed and versatility to beat any defender.

He was named one of FIBA's 50 Greatest Players in 1991. He was among the 105 player nominees for the 50 Greatest EuroLeague Contributors list. He was nicknamed, "The Prince".

Club career
While playing with CSKA Moscow, Myshkin won eight consecutive Soviet Union League titles, from 1977 to 1984. Even though his team was a FIBA European Champions Cup (EuroLeague) regular, Myshkin never had the chance to play for the European-wide top-tier level continental title.

National team career
As a member of the senior Soviet Union national team, Myshkin led them to back-to-back EuroBasket gold medals in 1979 and 1981. He also won the gold medal at the 1982 FIBA World Championship, in Colombia.

Coaching career
Following his retirement, Myshkin became a coach, and he coached the clubs CSKA Moscow, Arsenal Tula, Universitet Surgut, and Dynamo Kursk. In 2013, he became the head coach of the Russian women's national basketball team.

References

External links
Euroleague.net Profile
Fibaeurope.com Profile

1954 births
Living people
Basketball players at the 1976 Summer Olympics
Basketball players at the 1980 Summer Olympics
BC Dynamo Moscow players
BC Ural Yekaterinburg players
FIBA EuroBasket-winning players
FIBA World Championship-winning players
Medalists at the 1976 Summer Olympics
Medalists at the 1980 Summer Olympics
Olympic basketball players of the Soviet Union
Olympic bronze medalists for the Soviet Union
Olympic medalists in basketball
PBC CSKA Moscow players
People from Sverdlovsk Oblast
Power forwards (basketball)
Russian basketball coaches
Russian men's basketball players
Russian women's basketball coaches
Small forwards
Soviet men's basketball players
1978 FIBA World Championship players
1982 FIBA World Championship players
Sportspeople from Sverdlovsk Oblast